Tessaracoccus aquimaris is a Gram-positive, aerobic and non-motile bacterium from the genus Tessaracoccus which has been isolated from the intestine of the rockfish Sebastes schlegelii from a marine aquaculture pond.

References 

Propionibacteriales
Bacteria described in 2018